Discus textilis is an extinct species of air-breathing land snail, a terrestrial pulmonate gastropod mollusk in the family Discidae, the disk snails.

Discus textilis is considered to be extinct.

Distribution 
This species was endemic to La Palma, Canary Islands.

References

Discidae
Gastropods described in 1852